The shiny cowbird (Molothrus bonariensis) is a passerine bird in the New World family Icteridae. It breeds in most of South America except for dense forests and areas of high altitude such as mountains. Since 1900 the shiny cowbird's range has shifted northward, and it was recorded in the Caribbean islands as well as the United States, where it is found breeding in southern Florida. It is a bird associated with open habitats, including disturbed land from agriculture and deforestation.

Adults are sexually dimorphic. Males are all black with a purple-blue iridescence. The female is smaller, with dull brown plumage that is sometimes paler on the underparts. Females of the species can be distinguished from the female brown-headed cowbird by their longer, finer bills and flatter heads. The shiny cowbird's diet consists mainly of insects, other arthropods and seeds, and they have been recorded foraging for grains in cattle troughs.

Like most other cowbirds, it is an obligate brood parasite, laying its eggs in the nests of many other bird species such as the rufous-collared sparrow. Different host species show different responses to their nests being parasitised, with behaviours ranging from accepting and caring for the cowbird eggs, to rejecting the eggs from the nest. As the shiny cowbird is an effective generalist brood parasite, it can be considered the South American counterpart to the brown-headed cowbird.

Taxonomy 
The shiny cowbird is a passerine in the family Icteridae, which includes the blackbirds. The species was first described in 1789 by Johann Friedrich Gmelin. It has seven described subspecies due to geographic variation:

 Molothrus bonariensis bonariensis (Gmelin, 1789) - Eastern and southern Brazil, eastern Bolivia, Paraguay, Uruguay, Argentina, and introduced in Chile.
 Molothrus bonariensis cabanisii (Cassin, 1866) - Eastern Panama, western Colombia, eastern Andes, and southeastern Colombia.
 Molothrus bonariensis aequatorialis (Chapman, 1915) - southwestern Colombia, western Ecuador, Guayaquil, and Puná Island.
 Molothrus bonariensis occidentalis (Berlepsch and Stolzmann, 1892) - Extreme southwestern Ecuador, western Peru and northern Chile.
 Molothrus bonariensis venezuelensis (Stone, 1891) - Eastern Colombia and northern Venezuela.
 Molothrus bonariensis minimus (Dalmas, 1900) - Lesser Antilles, Tobago, Trinidad, Guianas, extreme northern Brazil, West Indies, Carriacou, Puerto Rico, Hispaniola (Dominican Republic and Haiti), Cuba, and Florida.
 Molothrus bonariensis riparius (Griscom and Greenway, 1937) - Lower Amazon Valley and eastern Peru.

Description 
Physical appearance of the shiny cowbird adult depends on subspecies. Sizes range from 31-40 grams in mass and 18 cm in length (M. b. minimus), to 55-65 grams in mass and 22 cm in length (M. b. cabanisii).

Basic adult plumage for M. b. bonariensis is black with purple-blue iridescence for males, and dusty gray-brown for females. M. b. cabanisii males  have plumage similar to M. b. bonariensis, while females are paler in colouration. M. b. aequatorialis males have violet iridescence and females are dark in colour. M. b. occidentalis males have rich purple iridescence, and females are distinct compared to the other subspecies as they have a pale upper body and very pale, streaked underparts. M. b. venezuelensis males look similar to M. b. occidentalis, and females dark in colour. M. b. minimus males look similar to M. b. bonariensis, and females have a darker head than M. b. bonariensis and have streaked scapulars and inter-scapulars. M. b. riparius males are similar to M. b. bonariensis, and the females have darker upper bodies and paler underparts than M. b. bonariensis.

Upon hatching, shiny cowbirds are altricial and are confined to their nests. Hatchlings are covered in a gray down. Juvenile males are dark on their upper body, with dull dray underparts streaked with dark brown or black, and a buff abdomen. Females are a buff brown colour on top, with light buff, brown, or gray underparts that may or may not be streaked with brown.

Eggs are ovate in shape, and can exist as either a spotted morph, or an unspotted "immaculate" morph. They are usually white in colour, though they sometimes take on a light blue, light gray, or buff hue.

Distribution and habitat 
The shiny cowbird is a year-round resident across most of South America, where it lives in open areas such as open forests and cultivated land. Within the last century, the range of the species has shifted northward, and birds have been recorded in the West Indies and southern Florida. This shift in range is due to increased human conversion of forests into open cultivated and agricultural land, habitats which are preferred by the shiny cowbird. This range shift into new regions allows the cowbird to exploit new naive host species.

Effect of deforestation 
Deforestation and conversion of forested land to open agricultural fields and pastures has led to a northward shift in the range of the shiny cowbird, as this species prefers open habitats. These deforested areas may be home to host species that were previously not parasitized by cowbirds. These naive hosts likely do not have defenses against parasitism, and may be more negatively affected by the presence of the cowbirds. The species spread from South America to mainland Puerto Rico in 1955, and subsequently reached the Dominican Republic in 1973, and Cuba in 1982. Since 1985, the shiny cowbird has been recorded in Florida.

Behaviour and ecology

Breeding

Sexual behaviour and courtship 
Shiny cowbirds do not form monogamous pairs. They have a promiscuous mating system where individuals will copulate with many different mates.

During courtship, male shiny cowbirds perform a song while circling a female, and when the song is finished they bow to their prospective mate. This bow is a display used in both mating rituals and as a show of aggression toward other males. It consists of the male ruffling his feathers while arching his wings and lowering his tail. The display is performed either on the ground, in a tree, or while flying. Following a successful mating display, the pair will copulate once.

Brood parasitism 

The shiny cowbird is an obligate brood parasite, meaning that adults will lay their eggs in the nests of other species and their offspring rely entirely on their hosts for parental care. They are generalists, and have about 250 different host species. As a host generalist, their young are non-mimetic, meaning they do not attempt to replicate the behaviours of host chicks like a host specialist species might. In regions of South America including Argentina, Uruguay, Brazil, and Venezuela, the main host species of the shiny cowbird is the rufous-collared sparrow.

Female shiny cowbirds do not build nests, as they rely on their hosts to care for their offspring, but they will preferentially select hosts that build enclosed nests such as nests built in cavities. They will look for host nests both actively, and by silently watching for hosts. When a host nest is found, they will flush the host away from the nest by noisily flying around the area. An individual shiny cowbird may lay its eggs across many different nests.

Host response 
Responses to parasitic eggs and chicks in the nest varies among hosts. Sometimes even within a host species, the response to parasitism is context-dependent. For example, when grayish baywings were acting as host parents to shiny cowbird young, cowbirds would only continue to receive parental care after they fledged if they had been raised alone in the nest without any baywing nest mates. Yellow warblers have been recorded to reject shiny cowbird eggs around 40% of the time, either by deserting their nest or building a new nest on top of the parasitised one. In hosts such as the creamy-bellied thrush, where parasitism by shiny cowbirds does not have a large negative effect on the survival of their own chicks, the hosts do not exhibit egg-ejection behaviour. This acceptance of parasitic eggs may also be due to the fact that the eggs are similar in appearance, and the host would risk harming its own eggs in the process.

Effect on host species 

Brood parasitism from shiny cowbirds will have a negative effect on the reproductive success of their hosts through a variety of factors employed by the different life stages of the cowbird. Adult females can negatively affect the host by pecking and killing host eggs and removing the host eggs from the nest. Shiny cowbird eggs have a short incubation period of about 10–11 days. Many of the parasite's hosts have eggs that incubate for longer. One of their main hosts across much of South America, the rufous-collared sparrow, has an incubation period of 12–13 days. The shiny cowbird will sometimes also lay an egg before the host species begins laying. Laying their eggs before their host, as well as having a shorter incubation period, allows for the hatching of the parasitic chick to occur before the host eggs hatch. When the cowbirds hatch before the sparrows in the nest, sparrows usually do not gain much weight and die within about three days. In one study, nestling mortality almost doubled when comparing a non-parasitised nest to one that had been parasitised by a shiny cowbird.

Shiny cowbirds can have a large negative effect on critically endangered species, such as the pale-headed brush finch. Human modification of their restricted geographic range led to habitat loss in the case of the finches, but also introduced more cowbirds into the now open area. Parasitism by shiny cowbirds is thought to be an important factor in the population decline of the pale-headed brush finch.

References

Further reading

Books
Pereira, J.F.M. 2008. Aves e Pássaros Comuns do Rio de Janeiro. Technical Books, Rio de Janeiro.

Articles

 Arendt WJ & Mora TAV. (1984). Range Expansion of the Shiny Cowbird in the Dominican-Republic. Journal of Field Ornithology. vol 55, no 1. p. 104-107.
 Astie AA. (2003). New record of Shiny Cowbird (Molothrus bonariensis) parasitism of Black-chinned Siskins (Carduelis barbata). Wilson Bulletin. vol 115, no 2. p. 212-213.
 Astie AA & Reboreda JC. (2006). Costs of egg punctures and parasitism by shiny cowbirds (Molothrus bonariensis) at Creamy-bellied Thrush (Turdus amaurochalinus) nests. Auk. vol 123, no 1. p. 23-32.
 Baltz ME. (1995). First records of the Shiny Cowbird (Molothrus bonariensis) in the Bahama Archipelago. Auk. vol 112, no 4. p. 1039-1041.
 Blanco DE. (1995). Brood Parasitism of the Shiny Cowbird Molothrus bonariensis on Chestnut-Capped Blackbird Agelaius ruficapillus, in Eastern Buenos Aires Province. Hornero. vol 14, no 1–2. p. 44-45.
 Cavalcanti RB & Pimentel TM. (1988). Shiny Cowbird Parasitism in Central Brazil. Condor. vol 90, no 1. p. 40-43.
 Cruz A & Andrews RW. (1997). The breeding biology of the Pied Water-Tyrant and its interactions with the Shiny Cowbird in Venezuela. Journal of Field Ornithology. vol 68, no 1. p. 91-97.
 Cruz A, Manolis TD & Andrews RW. (1990). Reproductive Interactions of the Shiny Cowbird Molothrus-Bonariensis and the Yellow-Hooded Blackbird Agelaius-Icterocephalus in Trinidad West Indies. Ibis vol 132, no 3. p. 436-444.
 Cruz A, Manolis TH & Andrews RW. (1995). History of shiny cowbird Molothrus bonariensis brood parasitism in Trinidad and Tobago. Ibis vol 137, no 3. p. 317-321.
 Debrot AO & Prins TG. (1992). First Record and Establishment of the Shiny Cowbird in Curaçao. Caribbean Journal of Science. vol 28, no 1–2. p. 104-105.
 Dolores M & Juan CR. (2005). Conspecific and heterospecific social learning in shiny cowbirds. Animal Behaviour. vol 70, p. 1087.
 Feare CJ & Zaccagnini ME. (1993). Roost departure by shiny cowbirds (Molothrus bonariensis). Hornero. vol 13, no 4. p. 292-293.
 Fiorini VD & Reboreda JC. (2006). Cues used by shiny cowbirds (Molothrus bonariensis) to locate and parasitise chalk-browed mockingbird (Mimus saturninus) nests. Behavioral Ecology and Sociobiology. vol 60, no 3. p. 379-385.
 Fraga RM. (2002). Notes on new or rarely reported Shiny Cowbird hosts from Argentina. Journal of Field Ornithology. vol 73, no 2. p. 213-219.
 Fraga RM. (2005). The Brown-backed Mockingbird (Mimus dorsalis) as a shiny cowbird (Molothrus bonariensis) host. Ornitologia Neotropical. vol 16, no 3. p. 435-436.
 Gabriela L. (1998). Parasitism by Shiny Cowbirds of Rufous-bellied Thrushes. The Condor. vol 100, no 4. p. 680.
 Gallardo JM. (1977). Molothrus-Bonariensis and Vigilance of Nests Parasitized by It. Physis Seccion C los Continentes y los Organismos Terrestres. vol 36, no 92. p. 345-346.
 Gochfeld M. (1978). Begging by Nestling Shiny Cowbirds Molothrus-Bonariensis Adaptive or Mal Adaptive. Living Bird. vol 17, p. 41-50.
 Grzybowski JA & Fazio VW, III. (1991). Shiny Cowbird Reaches Oklahoma USA. American Birds. vol 45, no 1. p. 50-52.
 Hutcheson WH & Post W. (1990). Shiny Cowbird Collected in South Carolina USA First North American Specimen. Wilson Bulletin. vol 102, no 3.
 Juan Pablo I. (2002). Nectarivorous feeding by Shiny Cowbirds: A complex feeding innovation. The Wilson Bulletin. vol 114, no 3. p. 412.
 Kattan GH. (1996). Growth and provisioning of Shiny Cowbird and House Wren host nestlings. Journal of Field Ornithology. vol 67, no 3. p. 434-441.
 Kattan GH. (1997). Shiny cowbirds follow the 'shotgun' strategy of brood parasitism. Animal Behaviour. vol 53, p. 647.
 King JR. (1973). Reproductive Relationships of the Rufous-Collared Sparrow and the Shiny Cowbird. Auk. vol 90, no 1. p. 19-34.
 Kluza DA. (1998). First record of Shiny Cowbird (Molothrus bonariensis) in Yucatan, Mexico. Wilson Bulletin. vol 110, no 3. p. 429-430.
 Lea SEG & Kattan GH. (1998). Reanalysis gives further support to the 'shotgun' model of shiny cowbird parasitism of house wren nests. Animal Behaviour. vol 56, p. 1571-1573.
 Lichtenstein G. (2001). Low success of shiny cowbird chicks parasitizing rufous-bellied thrushes: chick-chick competition or parental discrimination?. Animal Behaviour. vol 61, p. 401-413.
 Lopez-Ortiz R, Ventosa-Febles EA, Ramos-Alvarez KR, Medina-Miranda R & Cruz A. (2006). Reduction in host use suggests host specificity in individual shiny cowbirds (Molothrus bonariensis). Ornitologia Neotropical. vol 17, no 2. p. 259-269.
 Lyon BE. (1997). Spatial patterns of shiny cowbird brood parasitism on chestnut-capped blackbirds. Animal Behaviour. vol 54, p. 927-939.
 Mason P. (1986). Brood Parasitism in a Host Generalist the Shiny Cowbird Molothrus-Bonariensis I. the Quality of Different Species as Hosts. Auk. vol 103, no 1. p. 52-60.
 Mason P. (1986). Brood Parasitism in a Host Generalist the Shiny Cowbird Molothrus-Bonariensis Ii. Host Selection. Auk. vol 103, no 1. p. 61-69.
 Mason P & Rothstein SI. (1986). Coevolution and Avian Brood Parasitism Cowbird Molothrus-Bonariensis Eggs Show Evolutionary Response to Host Discrimination. Evolution. vol 40, no 6. p. 1207-1214.
 Mason P & Rothstein SI. (1987). CRYPSIS VERSUS MIMICRY AND THE COLOR OF SHINY COWBIRD EGGS. American Naturalist. vol 130, no 2. p. 161-167.
 Massoni V & Reboreda JC. (1998). Costs of brood parasitism and the lack of defenses on the yellow-winged blackbird shiny cowbird system. Behavioral Ecology and Sociobiology. vol 42, no 4. p. 273-280.
 Massoni V & Reboreda JC. (2001). Number of close spatial and temporal neighbors decreases the probability of nest failure and Shiny Cowbird parasitism in colonial Yellow-winged Blackbirds. Condor. vol 103, no 3. p. 521-529.
 Mermoz ME & Fernandez GJ. (1999). Low frequency of Shiny Cowbird parasitism on Scarlet-headed Blackbirds: anti-parasite adaptations or nonspecific host life-history traits?. Journal of Avian Biology. vol 30, no 1. p. 15-22.
 Mermoz ME & Reboreda JC. (1994). Brood parasitism of the shiny cowbird Molothrus bonariensis, on the brown-and-yellow Marshbird, Pseudoleistes virescens. Condor. vol 96, no 3. p. 716-721.
 Mermoz ME & Reboreda JC. (1999). Egg-laying behaviour by shiny cowbirds parasitizing brown-and-yellow marshbirds. Animal Behaviour. vol 58, p. 873.
 Mermoz ME & Reboreda JC. (2003). Reproductive success of shiny cowbird (Molothrus bonariensis) parasitizing the larger brown-and-yellow marshbird (Pseudoleistes virescens) in Argentina. Auk. vol 120, no 4. p. 1128-1139.
 Pereira LE, Suzuki A, Moraes Coimbra TL, Pereira de Souza R & Bocato Chamelet EL. (2001). [Ilheus arbovirus in wild birds (Sporophila caerulescens and Molothrus bonariensis)]. Revista de Saude Publica. vol 35, no 2. p. 119-123.
 Perez-Rivera RA. (1986). Parasitism by the Shiny Cowbird Molothrus-Bonariensis in the Interior Parts of Puerto-Rico. Journal of Field Ornithology. vol 57, no 2. p. 99-104.
 Porto GR & Piratelli A. (2005). Ethogram of the shiny cowbird, Molothrus bonariensis Gmelin (Aves, Emberizidae, Icterinae). Revista Brasileira de Zoologia. vol 22, no 2. p. 306-312.
 Post W. (1992). First Florida Specimens of the Shiny Cowbird. Florida Field Naturalist. vol 20, no 1. p. 17-18.
 Post W. (1993). First specimen of the shiny cowbird, Molothrus bonariensis (Aves: Emberizidae) in North Carolina. Brimleyana. vol 0, no 19. p. 205-208.
 Post W, Cruz A & McNair DB. (1993). The North American invasion pattern of the shiny cowbird. Journal of Field Ornithology. vol 64, no 1. p. 32-41.
 Post W, Nakamura TK & Cruz A. (1990). Patterns of Shiny Cowbird Parasitism in St. Lucia West Indies Southwestern Puerto Rico. Condor. vol 92, no 2. p. 461-469.
 Post W & Wiley JW. (1977). Reproductive Interactions of the Shiny Cowbird and the Yellow-Shouldered Blackbird. Condor. vol 79, no 2. p. 176-184.
 Post W & Wiley JW. (1977). The Shiny Cowbird in the West-Indies. Condor. vol 79, no 1. p. 119-121.
 Post W & Wiley JW. (1992). The head-down display in Shiny Cowbirds and its relation to dominance behavior. The Condor. vol 94, no 4. p. 999.
 Ruckdeschel C, Shoop CR & Sibley D. (1996). First sighting of the shiny cowbird in Georgia. Oriole. vol 61, no 2–3. p. 29-30.
 Sackmann P & Reboreda JC. (2003). A comparative study of Shiny Cowbird parasitism of two large hosts, the Chalk-browed Mockingbird and the Rufous-bellied Thrush. Condor. vol 105, no 4. p. 728-736.
 Salvador SA. (1984). Study of Parasitism in Raising Shiny Cowbirds Molothrus-Bonariensis and Chalk-Browed Mockingbirds Mimus-Saturninus in Villa Maria Cordoba Argentine. Hornero. vol 12, no 3. p. 141-149.
 Smith PW & Sprunt AI. (1987). The Shiny Cowbird Reaches the USA Will the Scourge of the Caribbean Impact Florida's Avifauna Too?. American Birds. vol 41, no 3. p. 370-371.
 Sykes PW, Jr. & Post W. (2001). First specimen and evidence of breeding by the shiny cowbird in Georgia. Oriole. vol 66, no 3–4. p. 45-51.
 Viviana M & Juan Carlos R. (2002). A neglected cost of brood parasitism: Egg punctures by Shiny Cowbirds during inspection of potential host nests. The Condor. vol 104, no 2. p. 407.
 Wiley JW. (1985). Shiny Cowbird Molothrus-Bonariensis Parasitism in 2 Avian Communities in Puerto-Rico. Condor. vol 87, no 2. p. 165-176.
 Wiley JW. (1986). Growth of Shiny Cowbirds Molothrus-Bonariensis and Host Chicks. Wilson Bulletin. vol 98, no 1. p. 126-131.

External links
Shiny cowbird videos, photos and sounds on the Internet Bird Collection
Shiny cowbird photo gallery VIREO

shiny cowbird
Brood parasites
Birds of Hispaniola
Birds of the Dominican Republic
Birds of Haiti
Birds of the Caribbean
Birds of South America
shiny cowbird
shiny cowbird